The FIFA Club World Cup is an international association football competition organised by the FIFA, the sport's global governing body. The championship was first contested as the FIFA Club World Championship in 2000. It was not held between 2001 and 2004 due to a combination of factors, most importantly the collapse of FIFA's marketing partner International Sport and Leisure. Following a change in format which saw the FIFA Club World Championship absorb the Intercontinental Cup, it was relaunched in 2005 and took its current name the season afterwards.

The current format of the tournament involves seven teams competing for the title at venues within the host nation over a period of about two weeks; the winners of that year's edition of the AFC Champions League, CAF Champions League, CONCACAF Champions League, Copa Libertadores, OFC Champions League, and UEFA Champions League, along with the host nation's national champion, participate in a straight knock-out tournament.

Confederation records

AFC

CAF

CONCACAF

CONMEBOL

OFC

UEFA

List of participating clubs of the FIFA Club World Cup
The following is a list of clubs that have played in or qualified for the FIFA Club World Cup. Editions in bold indicate competitions won. Rows can be adjusted to national league, total number of participations by national league or club and years played. Auckland City have contested the FIFA Club World Cup ten times, more than any other club.

Notes

References

External links
  
  

Participants